HMS Flying Fish was a 6-gun schooner taken into Royal Navy service in 1793. Flying Fish is notable for being the first ship in which William Beatty served as acting-surgeon from 1793 to 1794. Beatty was the naval surgeon who would go on to famously treat Admiral Nelson at the Battle of Trafalgar in 1805.

Early service

L'Esperanza was a French privateer operating out of Saint-Domingue, originally mounting four French 3-pounder guns. Both the towns of Jérémie and Mole St. Nicholas were captured by the squadron on 19 and 21 September, respectively, and Flying Fish helped to capture the French sloop Convention Nationale at Mole St. Nicholas.

Acting Surgeon William Beatty

William Beatty, formerly a surgeon's mate aboard the frigate , was appointed acting surgeon of the Flying Fish by Ford on 5 December 1793, his predecessor having died (possibly of Yellow fever) at the naval hospital in Jamaica. Under the command of Lieutenant James Prevost, Flying Fish spent the end of 1793 and the early parts of 1794 ferrying French Royalist deputations to and from Mole St. Nicholas before taking part in the blockade of Port-au-Prince, serving as a supply ship, as well as intercepting five French vessels attempting to run the blockade in less than one month. On 4 May 1794 Flying Fish helped repulse a French land attack on Fort Le Cul, in Leogane, by standing close inshore and firing on the attacking French troops. On 1 June Flying Fish was used to clear a beachhead for assaulting British troops in their attack on Port-au-Prince, again using her shallow draught to allow her to get close to the beach, firing against French soldiers on shore and helping the British forces under Ford ultimately capture the city. On 25 June 1794 he was appointed acting-surgeon of the 28-gun frigate  at Port-au-Prince. In all, Beatty served aboard Flying Fish for approximately seven months.

Capture, French service, and recapture

A year later, in June 1795, under the command of Lieutenant George Seaton, Flying Fish was captured by two or possibly three French privateers off Gonaive on her way to Jamaica; she was renamed Poisson Volant and taken into French service. Sailing from Aux Cayes to New York City, Poisson Volant was intercepted by HMS Esperance and HMS Bonetta and captured; in an effort to escape, the French crew of thirty-eight men under the command of a sub-Lieutenant of the French ship Concorde had cut away the gunwales of Poisson Volant and threw some of her guns overboard.

Fate

From 6 May 1797 until 1799, Flying Fish mounted six guns. Flying Fish was ultimately sold out of British service in 1799.

Citations

References
 Brockliss, Laurence, et al. (2005) "Nelson's Surgeon: William Beatty, Naval Medicine, and the Battle of Trafalgar." (Oxford University Press).
 
 Clowes, W. Laird, et al. (1897–1903) The royal navy: a history from the earliest times to the present. (Boston: Little, Brown and Co.; London: S. Low, Marston and Co.).
 Marley, David F. (2008) Wars of the Americas: A Chronology of Armed Conflict in the Western Hemisphere, 1492 to the Present: Volume 2. (ABC-CLIO). 
 Winfield, Rif. (2008) "British Warships in the Age of Sail, 1793–1817: Design, Construction, Careers and Fates." (Seaforth Publishing)

Schooners of the French Navy
Schooners of the Royal Navy
Captured ships
Maritime incidents in 1793
Maritime incidents in 1795
Maritime incidents in 1797